Gandra Venkata Ramana Reddy is the Telangana Rashtra Samithi member of the Telangana Legislative Assembly for the Bhupalpalle constituency, and was, before Telangana became a separate state, member of the Andhra Pradesh Legislative Assembly for the same constituency, where he acted as Chief Whip from 2009 to 2014.

His father is G. Mohan Reddy and he is married to G. Jyothi. He is an agriculturist by profession.

References

1964 births
Living people
Andhra Pradesh MLAs 2009–2014
Telangana MLAs 2018–2023
Indian National Congress politicians from Telangana
People from Warangal
Indian National Congress politicians from Andhra Pradesh